Coluzea liriope is a species of large sea snail, marine gastropod mollusk in the family Columbariidae.

Description

Distribution
This marine species occurs off Kalimantan, Indonesia.

References

 Harasewych M.G., 1986. The Columbariinae (Gastropoda: Turbinellidae) of the eastern Indian Ocean. Journal of the Malacological Society of Australia 7(3-4): 155-177

Columbariidae
Gastropods described in 1986